There are over 500 museums and galleries in South Korea.

National museums

Museums in Seoul

Provincial and private museums

See also
Architecture of South Korea
List of South Korean tourist attractions
List of tallest buildings in Seoul

References

External links
Korean museum association
 List of museums in South Korea
 List of museums in South Korea at Encyber.com

 
 
Museums
South Korea

Lists of organizations based in South Korea